St. Mary's Episcopal Church, also known as the Flandreau Indian School Chapel, is a historic church on North Crescent Street in Flandreau, South Dakota.

It was built in 1879 and was added to the National Register in 2001.

It is one of numerous historic sites in Flandreau, one of South Dakota's oldest cities.

References

Episcopal churches in South Dakota
Churches on the National Register of Historic Places in South Dakota
Gothic Revival church buildings in South Dakota
Churches completed in 1879
Churches in Moody County, South Dakota
19th-century Episcopal church buildings
National Register of Historic Places in Moody County, South Dakota